Andreas Mitterfellner (born 17 June 1981) is an Austrian judoka.

Achievements

References

External links
 

1981 births
Living people
Austrian male judoka
20th-century Austrian people
21st-century Austrian people